Subanik is a ceremonial stew-like dish originated from the Maya of Guatemala. A variety of chili peppers as well as meats are characteristic of this dish and the main components of its flavor. The dish is usually served alongside rice and tamales.

Origin
Subanik is attributed to a specific region in Guatemala, San Martin Jilotepeque. This dish originated amongst the Kaqchikel Maya of Guatemala. Though the original dish has diversified as it may appear in homes today, the concept, as its name suggests, is still the same. The ending “-ik” in the Kaqchikel language in referring to a dish means that chilies are part of the dish.

Process
Traditionally, the dish is cooked in a nest made of several mashan leaves that is tied down with a rope. It is steamed through the leaves at the top with cibaque. In places where mashan leaves are unavailable, a Dutch oven can be used as a substitute. Subanik is typically served on a serving dish lined with banana leaves for presentation.

Ingredients
Prominent chili pepper, chicken, pork, and beef. For the vegetarian version of Subanik, meats can be substitute with mushrooms or eggplant.

References

External links 
Cuisine: Subanik
Subanik, Guatemalan Stew

Guatemalan cuisine